Year 1386 (MCCCLXXXVI) was a common year starting on Monday (link will display the full calendar) of the Julian calendar.

Events 
 January–December 
 February 24 – Elizabeth of Bosnia, the mother of the overthrown Queen Mary of Hungary and Croatia, arranges the assassination of Charles III of Naples, the ruler of Hungary, Naples, Achaea and Croatia, with the result that: 
 Mary is reinstated as Queen of Hungary and Croatia. 
 Charles' son, Ladislaus, becomes King of Naples. 
 A period of interregnum begins in Achaea, lasting until 1396. The rule of Achaea is sought by numerous pretenders, none of whom can be considered to have reigned.
 March 4 – Grand Duke of Lithuania Jogaila (having been baptised on February 15 in Wawel Cathedral, Kraków, and on February 18 married Jadwiga, 12-year-old queen regnant of Poland) is crowned Władysław II Jagiełło, King of Poland, beginning the Jagiellonian dynasty.
 May 9 – King John I of Portugal and King Richard II of England ratify the Treaty of Windsor.
 May 20 – Earliest recorded mention of the city of Pitești, in modern-day Romania. 
 July 9 – Battle of Sempach: The Swiss safeguard independence from Habsburg rule.
 July – John of Gaunt leaves England to make good his claim to the throne of Castile by right of his second marriage to Constanza of Castile in 1371.
 September 23 – Dan I of Wallachia (modern-day southern Romania) is killed in battle against the Bulgarians and is succeeded by Mircea the Elder, one of the greatest rulers of Wallachia.
 October 18 – Heidelberg University (Ruprecht-Karls-Universität Heidelberg), the oldest in Germany, is founded at the behest of Rupert I, Elector Palatine, by charter of Pope Urban VI.
 November 21 – Timur's invasions of Georgia: Timurid dynasty Turco-Mongol leader Timur captures and sacks the Georgian capital of Tbilisi, taking King Bagrat V prisoner.

 Date unknown 
 The mother and sister of Queen Jadwiga of Poland are kidnapped by rebels in Hungary-Croatia. 
 Abu al-Abbas is reinstated as ruler of the Marinid dynasty in modern-day Morocco.
 The Republic of Venice takes control of the island of Corfu.
 Construction begins on the Brancacci Chapel in Florence.
 Rozhdestvensky monastery is built in Muscovy.

Births 
 March 12 – Ashikaga Yoshimochi, Japanese shōgun (d. 1428)
 June 24 – Giovanni da Capistrano, Italian saint (d. 1456)
 August 9 or September 16 – King Henry V of England (d. 1422) 
 date unknown – Niccolò Piccinino, Italian mercenary (d. 1444)
 probable – Donatello, Italian sculptor (d. 1466)

Deaths 
 July 9 – Leopold III, Duke of Austria (in battle) (b. 1351)
 August 20 – Bo Jonsson (Grip), royal marshal of Sweden 
 September 23 – Dan I of Wallachia (in battle)
 December 31 – Johanna of Bavaria, Queen of Bohemia (b. c. 1362)
 date unknown 
 Al-Wathiq II, caliph of Cairo
 Takatsukasa Fuyumichi, Japanese nobleman (b. 1330)
 probable – William Langland, English poet (b. 1332)

References